Northern Football Club was a football club based at Hyde Park in the Springburn area of Glasgow, Scotland. The club was a founder member of Scottish Football League Division Two, but left after a single season.

History
The club was formed in 1874, as a football playing branch of the Northern Cricket Club, although details of their early years are largely unknown; in its second season, the club won 9 of its 14 matches.   In 1883 they merged with another local team Petershill (a different club from the surviving Junior club of that name) and were founder members of the Glasgow Football Association in the same year.

They were founder members of the Scottish Football Alliance in 1891 following a number of teams in leaving the Alliance two years later to form the new Division Two of the Scottish League. 1893–94 proved to be their sole season in the league, with the club finishing ninth and failing re-election. They returned to the Scottish Alliance but during the course of the 1896–97 season they were wound up.

Petershill Juniors were formed in summer 1897, just after Northern folded and a year after Cowlairs; due to the circumstances they could be seen as a successor representing the Springburn area, albeit their club history does not mention those clubs, only linking their formation to the demise of St Mungo's Juniors in the area.

Colours

The club's original colours, as agreed at the initial meeting, were royal blue and scarlet hoops.   By 1877 the club had changed to light and dark blue shirts with white knickers.

Ground

The club originally played at Lodge Park, but opened its new ground at Hyde Park on 13 February 1875, with a game between the club's first and second elevens.

Scottish League records
Record win: 5–2 v Abercorn
Record defeat: 0–7 v Cowlairs

References

External links
Northern Historical Kits

 
Defunct football clubs in Scotland
Association football clubs established in 1874
Association football clubs disestablished in 1896
Football clubs in Glasgow
Scottish Football League teams
1874 establishments in Scotland
1896 disestablishments in Scotland
Springburn